Rachel Kushner (born 1968) is an American writer, known for her novels Telex from Cuba (2008), The Flamethrowers (2013), and The Mars Room (2018).

Early life
Kushner was born in Eugene, Oregon, the daughter of two Communist scientists, one Jewish and one Unitarian, whom she has called "deeply unconventional people from the beatnik generation." Her mother arranged after-school work for her straightening and alphabetizing books at a feminist bookstore when she was 5 years old, and Kushner says "it was instilled in me that I was going to be a writer of some kind from a young age." Kushner moved with her family to San Francisco in 1979.

When she was 16, she began her bachelor's degree in political economy at the University of California, Berkeley with an emphasis on United States foreign policy in Latin America. Kushner lived as an exchange student in Italy when she was 18; upon completing her Bachelor of Arts, she lived in San Francisco, working at nightclubs. At 26, she enrolled in the fiction program at Columbia University and earned a MFA in creative writing in 2000. One of her influences is the American novelist Don DeLillo.

Career

Novels
Kushner's first novel, Telex from Cuba, was published by Scribner in July 2008. She got the idea for her novel after completing her MFA in 2000, and she made three long trips to Cuba over the six years it took her to write the book. Telex from Cuba was the cover review of the July 6, 2008 issue of The New York Times Book Review, where it was described as a "multi-layered and absorbing" novel whose "sharp observations about human nature and colonialist bias provide a deep understanding of the revolution's causes."  Telex from Cuba was a finalist for the 2008 National Book Award. Kushner's editor is Nan Graham.

Kushner's second novel, The Flamethrowers, was published by Scribner in April 2013. Vanity Fair hailed it for its "blazing prose," which "ignites the 70s New York art scene and Italian underground." In The New Yorker, critic James Wood praised the book as "scintillatingly alive. It ripples with stories, anecdotes, set-piece monologues, crafty egotistical tall tales, and hapless adventures: Kushner is never not telling a story... It succeeds because it is so full of vibrantly different stories and histories, all of them particular, all of them brilliantly alive." The Flamethrowers was a finalist for the 2013 National Book Award, and it was named a top book of 2013 by New York Magazine,
Time Magazine,
The New Yorker,
O, The Oprah Magazine,
New York Times Book Review,
Los Angeles Times,
San Francisco Chronicle,
Vogue,
Wall Street Journal,
Salon,
Slate,
Daily Beast,
Flavorwire,
The Millions,
The Jewish Daily Forward, and
Austin American-Statesman.

Kushner's third novel, The Mars Room, was published by Scribner in May 2018. In September 2018 it was shortlisted for the Man Booker Prize.

Journalism
After completing her MFA, Kushner lived in New York City for eight years, where she was an editor at Grand Street and BOMB. She has written widely on contemporary art, including numerous features in Artforum.

In 2016, Kushner visited Israel, as part of a project by the "Breaking the Silence" organization, to write an article for a book on the Israeli occupation, to mark the 50th anniversary of the Six-Day War. The book was edited by Michael Chabon and Ayelet Waldman, and was published under the title "Kingdom of Olives and Ash: Writers Confront the Occupation", in June 2017.

Personal life
Kushner lives in Los Angeles, California with her husband Jason Smith and their son Remy.

Awards and honors
 2018 National Book Critics Circle Finalist
 2018 Man Booker Prize Shortlist
2018 Prix Médicis Etranger winner
2016 Harold D Vursell Award from the American Academy of Arts and Letters
2015 Telluride Film Festival (42nd Guest Director)
2014 Folio Prize shortlist for The Flamethrowers
 2013 Honorary PhD from Kalamazoo College 
 2013 Guggenheim Fellow 
 2013 National Book Award (Finalist)
 2008 National Book Award (Finalist)

Bibliography
 Telex from Cuba (2008)
 The Flamethrowers (2013)
 The Strange Case of Rachel K (2015)
 The Mars Room (2018)
 The Mayor of Leipzig (2021)
The Hard Crowd: Essays 2000–2020 (2021)

Notes

External links

Review of The Flamethrowers in The New Yorker
Review of Telex from Cuba in The New York Times
Review of Telex from Cuba in The Washington Post
Feature on Telex from Cuba in Los Angeles Times
Review of Telex from Cuba in The Seattle Times
Feature on Telex from Cuba in Time Out New York
Review of Telex from Cuba in Bookforum
Excerpt from Telex from Cuba published in The New York Times
Interview with The Paris Review

1968 births
Living people
21st-century American essayists
21st-century American novelists
21st-century American women writers
American magazine editors
American women essayists
American women novelists
Columbia University School of the Arts alumni
Novelists from Oregon
The New Yorker people
University of California, Berkeley alumni
Writers from Eugene, Oregon
Women magazine editors
Prix Médicis étranger winners